Jim O'Doherty (born 1959) is an American television producer, writer and actor.

As a television producer and writer he is best known for his work on the sitcoms Grounded for Life and 3rd Rock from the Sun. He was nominated for a Primetime Emmy Award for his work on the latter series, as a part of the producing and writing team.

O'Doherty's other television credits include Out of the Blue, The Tracy Morgan Show and Brothers... as well as the sitcoms Kickin' It and How to Rock, in which he is credited as creator for both series. He has collaborated with fellow producer and writer David M. Israel on the series 3rd Rock from the Sun, Grounded for Life, The Tracy Morgan Show and Brothers.
 
As an actor, O'Doherty has had small roles in the television series Married... with Children, That '70s Show, 3rd Rock from the Sun, Grounded for Life, and Kickin' It, as well as appearing in the films Megaville (1990) and Basket Case 3: The Progeny (1992).

Prior to acting, O'Doherty started his career in the entertainment industry as a stand-up comedian. He also worked as an audience warm-up man for numerous TV sitcoms...including Unhappily Ever After, Suddenly Susan and Married...With Children.

References

External links

American male film actors
American stand-up comedians
American male television actors
American television producers
American television writers
American male television writers
Living people
Place of birth missing (living people)
1959 births
Showrunners